Charles Edward O'Bannon Jr. (born March 1, 1999) is an American college basketball player for the TCU Horned Frogs of the Big 12 Conference. He previously played for the USC Trojans.

Early life
O'Bannon was born to Valencia and Charles O'Bannon, who was playing professional basketball. O'Bannon lived in Japan from ages 2 to 14 while his father was playing there.

O'Bannon attended Bishop Gorman High School in Las Vegas, Nevada. He averaged 21.4 points as a senior at Bishop Gorman. In December 2016, he committed to the USC Trojans. He chose USC over UNLV, NC State, and UCLA. He was named a McDonald's All-American.

College career
O'Bannon was the first McDonald's All-American to join USC since DeMar DeRozan in 2008. He struggled with injuries during his two and a half seasons with the Trojans. After suffering an injury to his left pinky finger that required surgery, he redshirted the 2018-19 season. O'Bannon injured his middle finger early in the following season and played three games. He played a total of 18 games at USC and averaged 1.8 points and 0.8 rebounds per game. In January 2020, O'Bannon transferred to TCU and was later granted a waiver for immediate eligibility.

In 2021–22, TCU was a No. 9 seed in the 2022 NCAA tournament, and earned their first NCAA Tournament win in 35 years. O'Bannon scored a career-high 23 points in a second-round loss to Arizona, ending the Horned Frogs bid to reach the Sweet 16 for the first time.

Career statistics

College

|-
| style="text-align:left;"| 2017–18
| style="text-align:left;"| USC
| 14 || 0 || 5.1 || .217 || .125 || 1.000 || .6 || .1 || .3 || .0 || 1.3
|-
| style="text-align:left;"| 2018–19
| style="text-align:left;"| USC
| 1 || 0 || 10.0 || .000 || – || – || 1.0 || .0 || .0 || .0 || .0
|-
| style="text-align:left;"| 2019–20
| style="text-align:left;"| USC
| 3 || 0 || 6.3 || .000 || – || 1.000 || 1.3 || .3 || .7 || .0 || .7
|-
| style="text-align:left;"| 2020–21
| style="text-align:left;"| TCU
| 25 || 16 || 18.0 || .407 || .368 || .756 || 3.8 || .4 || .8 || .5 || 6.8
|- class="sortbottom"
| style="text-align:center;" colspan="2"| Career
| 43 || 16 || 12.8 || .366 || .345 || .800 || 2.6 || .3 || .6 || .3 || 4.4

Personal life
O'Bannon's father, Charles, and uncle, Ed O'Bannon, were teammates on UCLA's 1994–95 national title team.

References

External links
TCU Horned Frogs bio
USC Trojans bio
USA Basketball bio

1999 births
Living people
American men's basketball players
Basketball players from Long Beach, California
Basketball players from Nevada
Bishop Gorman High School alumni
McDonald's High School All-Americans
Shooting guards
Small forwards
Sportspeople from Las Vegas
TCU Horned Frogs men's basketball players
USC Trojans men's basketball players